Albert Matthew Kookesh, Jr. (November 24, 1948 – May 28, 2021) was an American politician who served as a member of the Alaska Senate. He represented District C as a Democrat from 2005 through 2013. Previously he was a member of the Alaska House of Representatives from 1997 through 2005.

Kookesh received his Juris Doctor degree from the University of Washington in 1976 and was a commercial fisherman, who owned and operated a lodge and market. He was on the board of directors of the Sealaska Corporation and was a co-chair of the Alaska Federation of Natives. His earlier professional positions included Business Manager, Executive VP, and Acting President/CEO for Kootznoowoo Inc.

He is of the Tlingit Nation, Eagle Tribe, Teikweidí (Brown Bear) Clan, child of L'eeneidí (Dog Salmon) Clan.

He died on May 28, 2021, in Angoon, Alaska at age 72.

Electoral career
In 2010 a legislative review found Kookesh to be in violation of state ethics policies following allegations that he used political influence to keep a city council from opposing a lands bill pushed by the Native corporation by which he was employed.  He lost the 2012 election to fellow incumbent Bert Stedman after the Alaska Redistricting Board placed him in a district that was vastly different from his former bush district.

References

External links
 Alaska State Legislature – Senator Albert Kookesh official government website
 Project Vote Smart – Senator Albert M. Kookesh (AK) profile
 Follow the Money – Albert M Kookesh
 2006 2004 Senate campaign contributions
 2002 2000 1998 1996 House campaign contributions
 Albert Kookesh at 100 Years of Alaska's Legislature

1948 births
2021 deaths
20th-century American politicians
21st-century American politicians
20th-century Native Americans
21st-century Native Americans
Alaska Native people
Democratic Party Alaska state senators
Democratic Party members of the Alaska House of Representatives
Native American state legislators in Alaska
Politicians from Juneau, Alaska
Tlingit people